The Coachella Canal is a  aqueduct that conveys Colorado River water for irrigation northwest from the All-American Canal to the Coachella Valley north of the Salton Sea in Riverside County, California.

The canal was completed in 1949 and is currently operated by the Coachella Valley Water District.

Construction of the Coachella Canal began in the 1930s by the Six Companies, Inc., but was interrupted by World War II. After the war, work was resumed on the canal and deliveries of water began in the late 1940s.

The canal was mostly earth-lined when it was first constructed, except for the last 38 miles, which were concrete-lined. Today, most of the canal is lined with concrete to prevent water loss from seepage. Grass eating fish are stocked in the canal to prevent water loss to aquatic vegetation.

See also
All-American Canal
All-American Canal Bridge
Alamo Canal
Imperial Irrigation District
Imperial Land Company
California Development Company
Imperial Valley

References

External links 
 
 Coachella Valley Water District-Water and the Coachella Valley

Imperial Valley
Aqueducts in California
Interbasin transfer
Irrigation in the United States
Coachella Valley
Lower Colorado River Valley
Geography of the Colorado Desert
Bodies of water of Imperial County, California
Bodies of water of Riverside County, California
Transportation buildings and structures in Imperial County, California
Transportation buildings and structures in Riverside County, California
Colorado River
Canals opened in 1949
1949 establishments in California